Eggah ( ʻaggat el-bayḍ) is an egg-based dish in Arab cuisine that is similar to a frittata. It is also known as Arab omelet. Eggah is commonly seasoned with spices such as cinnamon, cumin, coriander seeds or leaves, turmeric, raisins, pine nuts, nutmeg and fresh herbs. It is generally thick, commonly filled with vegetables and sometimes meat and cooked until completely firm.  It is usually circle-shaped and served sliced into rectangles or wedges, sometimes hot and sometimes cold. Eggah can be served as an appetizer, main course or side dish.

Variations of the eggah can include fillings such as; zucchini, onion, tomato, spinach, bread, artichoke, chicken and leek.

There is a similar dish in Indonesia called martabak, which involves creating an egg skin (or sometimes a thin dough) to cook it from within; it is also served with a dipping sauce. Eggah is also similar to a frittata, Spanish omelette, Persian kuku or a French-style omelette.

See also
 
 
 , a similar Persian egg dish
 
 List of egg dishes

References

External links 
 Egypt-Eggah bel Kharshouf/Kousa (Artichoke and Zucchini Omelet) by Grant Klover
 Zucchini Eggah W/Tomato Garnish by @katie in the UP

Arab cuisine
Egg dishes
Egyptian cuisine
Stuffed dishes